Nicholas Ian Newman is a Paralympian athlete from Bloemfontein, South Africa primarily competing in the category F36 javelin events. He was diagnosed with Cerebral palsy from birth.

Sporting events of note 
In the 2001 SA Games (in Stellenbosch, South Africa) he broke the Senior world record whilst a Junior and in the 2003 SA Games (in Germiston, South Africa) he broke his own world record.

In 2004, Newman competed in the 2004 Summer Paralympics in Athens, Greece in which he was not awarded a medal in the F36 shotput but continued on to win the gold medal in the F36/38 javelin competition.  Four years later in the 2008 Summer Paralympics in Beijing, China he finished third, awarded a bronze medal, whilst attempting to defend his title in the F36/38 javelin event.

In 2013 he competed in the ITU World Triathlon Grand Final, held in London, where he finished 13th. In 2015, he competed in the ITU World Paratriathlon Event held in Buffalo City, South Africa in which he finished 12th. One year later he competed again and placed 13th.

In 2014, 2015, 2017, and 2018, he competed in the RSA Paratriathlon National Championships placing fourth twice, second, and first respectively. In 2017, Newman placed second to Ryan Jarrett Willers, the sole other athlete in the PTS5 Men category. The time achieved in the 2017 event by Newman was 1 hour, 38 minutes and 4 seconds.

He recently completed a 70.3 Ironman in Buffalo City, South Africa.

In 2019, Newman was selected to participate in the ITU World Triathlon Grand Final Lausanne in Lausanne, Switzerland from August 30, 2019, to September 1, 2019. He placed 96th in his category of 35-39 Male AG Sprint, with a time of 1 hour, 28 minutes and 4 seconds.

On the 5th of September 2021, Newman completed a half Ironman 70.3 triathlon in 6 hours, 2 minutes and 5 seconds, finishing 236th overall and 191st out of all males completing the race.

On the 21st of November 2021, Newman completed a full Ironman 140.6 African champs in Nelson Mandela Bay (in Port Elizabeth, South Africa) in 13 hours, 39 minutes and 49 seconds, thereby placing 595th overall, 101st in his division and 493rd out of all males.

References

External links
News 24 on Nicholas Ian Newman
 Sascoc Triathlon
 World Triathlon - Profile for Nicholas Newman

Paralympic athletes of South Africa
Athletes (track and field) at the 2004 Summer Paralympics
Athletes (track and field) at the 2008 Summer Paralympics
Paralympic gold medalists for South Africa
Paralympic bronze medalists for South Africa
Living people
1981 births
Medalists at the 2004 Summer Paralympics
Medalists at the 2008 Summer Paralympics
Paralympic medalists in athletics (track and field)
South African male javelin throwers
Sportspeople from Bloemfontein